The 1961 CCCF Championship was played in March 1961 in San José, Costa Rica. Costa Rica emerged as champion. It was the final edition of the tournament, as shortly afterward the CCCF was subsumed into CONCACAF.

First round

Group 1

Group 2

Final round

References

External links
 CCCF Championship on RSSSF Archive

CCCF Championship
International association football competitions hosted by Costa Rica
Cccf Championship, 1961
CCCF
1961 in Central American sport
1961 in Costa Rican sport
March 1961 sports events in North America
Sports competitions in San José, Costa Rica
20th century in San José, Costa Rica